Almshouse Farm at Machipongo, now known as the Barrier Islands Center, is a historic almshouse for Northampton County residents.  Residents, also known as "inmates", included those sent for unpaid debts but also included homeless people, the mentally ill, orphans and those with diseases like tuberculosis and smallpox. "Inmates" were generally directed by the court to live at the almshouse. The Almshouse Farm served as the site for the Northampton County poorhouse for almost 150 years, from 1804 until 1952.   African-Americans were housed in a separate building on the property located at Machipongo, Northampton County, Virginia. The oldest of the three main buildings was built about 1725, and is a 1 1/2-half story structure built in two parts, one brick and one frame, and probably predates the almshouse use of the property. The main building was built about 1840, and is a frame, two-story building in the vernacular Greek Revival style. It housed residents of the almshouse farm. A building dated to 1910, is a one-story frame building in a form resembling that of one-story frame school buildings from the same period and was specifically constructed to separately house African-American residents. There were 10 rooms for the black poor, and no in-house plumbing. 
This building was renovated in 2013 and now serves as the BIC Education Building. Also on the property are two contributing small, frame, late-19 or early 20th-century outbuildings. The Northampton County Almshouse Farm was in continuous operation between 1803 and 1952.

It was listed on the National Register of Historic Places in 2002.

Barrier Islands Center
The Barrier Islands Center is housed on the former site of the Almshouse Farm.  The Center has three main activities, as a local history museum, as an education and enrichment center, and as a community gathering place.

The Barrier Islands Center Museum interprets the culture and history of the people of the Barrier Islands using historic photographs and artifacts.

The Center offers programs, workshops, concerts and events about the arts, culture, nature, science and history for all ages.

References

External links
 Barrier Islands Center

African-American history of Virginia
Farms on the National Register of Historic Places in Virginia
Greek Revival houses in Virginia
Buildings and structures completed in 1725
Buildings and structures in Northampton County, Virginia
National Register of Historic Places in Northampton County, Virginia
1725 establishments in Virginia
Residential buildings on the National Register of Historic Places in Virginia